Queensmead School is a co-educational secondary school with academy status located on Queens Walk, South Ruislip, in the London Borough of Hillingdon, England. In 2009, Queensmead established a federation with Northwood School. It offers a wide range of subjects with multiple sports grounds.

Academic standards

The school had an Ofsted inspection in March 2008 and was assessed as Outstanding, Grade 1 on a four-point scale. 
The school was assessed by Ofsted again in July 2022 and its rating was decreased to Good, Grade 2 on a four-point scale.

In 2008, 44% of students achieved 5 A*–C grades at GCSE.

Notable former pupils
 Lee McQueen – Winner of 2008 The Apprentice
 Scouting for Girls – Band member
 Elyar Fox – Singer
 Daniel Bramble – Professional athlete
 Chris Mepham – Professional footballer for AFC Bournemouth and the Wales national football team
 Tiff Stevenson – Professional comedian and panellist
 Tariq Lamptey – Professional footballer for Brighton & Hove Albion F.C. and the England national football team

References

External links
 

Educational institutions established in 1952
Academies in the London Borough of Hillingdon
Secondary schools in the London Borough of Hillingdon
1952 establishments in England